Robin Christopher Joseph (born September 10, 1969) is a Canadian former professional ice hockey defenceman who played in the National Hockey League (NHL) for the Pittsburgh Penguins, Edmonton Oilers, Tampa Bay Lightning, Philadelphia Flyers, Vancouver Canucks, Phoenix Coyotes and Atlanta Thrashers.

Playing career
Joseph was drafted 5th overall by the Penguins in the 1987 NHL Entry Draft. He made his NHL debut for the Penguins during the 1987–88 NHL season but was quickly traded to the Edmonton Oilers in the same season. The deal saw Joseph, Dave Hannan, Moe Mantha and Craig Simpson move to the Oilers with Paul Coffey, Dave Hunter and Wayne Van Dorp moving to Pittsburgh. After seven seasons with the Oilers he was traded to the Tampa Bay Lightning for Bob Beers.

He then began a second spell at Pittsburgh who signed him as a free agent, although after two seasons he was claimed off waivers by Vancouver.

He then signed with Philadelphia for two seasons before moving on to the Ottawa Senators. He would never play for the Senators though and was claimed off waivers just a month later by Vancouver. He was claimed off waiver for a third time in the season, this time by the Phoenix Coyotes. The next season, he was claimed off waivers one more time by Atlanta before leaving the NHL

In total, Joseph played 510 regular season games, scoring 39 goals with 112 assists for 151 points and collecting 567 penalty minutes. Joseph also played 31 playoff games, scoring 3 goals with 4 assists for 7 points, collecting 24 penalty minutes. In 2001, he moved to Europe to play in Finland's SM-liiga for TPS, before spending 3 seasons in the Deutsche Eishockey Liga in Germany for the Adler Mannheim. He then played in Italy for HC Milano Vipers in Serie A before retiring.

Personal life
Since retiring Joseph became a City of Edmonton firefighter in early 2007.

His son, Jaxon, was killed in the Humboldt Broncos bus crash on April 6, 2018.

Career statistics

Regular season and playoffs

International

Awards
 WHL West Second All-Star Team – 1987

References

External links
 

1969 births
Living people
Adler Mannheim players
Atlanta Thrashers players
Canadian ice hockey defencemen
Cape Breton Oilers players
Cincinnati Cyclones (IHL) players
Edmonton Oilers players
HC Milano players
Sportspeople from Burnaby
National Hockey League first-round draft picks
Nova Scotia Oilers players
Phoenix Coyotes players
Philadelphia Flyers players
Philadelphia Phantoms players
Pittsburgh Penguins draft picks
Pittsburgh Penguins players
Seattle Thunderbirds players
Tampa Bay Lightning players
HC TPS players
Vancouver Canucks players
Ice hockey people from British Columbia
Canadian expatriate ice hockey players in Italy
Canadian expatriate ice hockey players in Finland
Canadian expatriate ice hockey players in Germany